The Samuel C. Dunham House in Tonopah, Nevada was built in 1904. It is a typical example of the houses built at the time by prosperous businessmen in Tonopah. The bungalow-style house features six tapered shingled columns supporting an expansive front porch, which curves around the corner. It was listed on the National Register of Historic Places in 1982.

References

External links
National Register of Historic Places - Samuel C. Dunham House

Houses on the National Register of Historic Places in Nevada
Houses completed in 1904
Victorian architecture in Nevada
Shingle Style houses
National Register of Historic Places in Tonopah, Nevada
Houses in Nye County, Nevada
Shingle Style architecture in Nevada